Viacheslav Tyrtyshnik (born 16 January 1971) is a Ukrainian athlete. He competed in the men's high jump at the 1996 Summer Olympics.

References

1971 births
Living people
Athletes (track and field) at the 1996 Summer Olympics
Ukrainian male high jumpers
Olympic athletes of Ukraine
Place of birth missing (living people)